Wayne Robert James (born 27 August 1965) is a former cricketer who played as a wicket-keeper batsman for Zimbabwe. Between 2010 and 2014, James was also part of the selection panel for the national team.

His highest first-class score of 215 was made for Matabeleland in the 1995–96 Logan Cup. In the final of the competition, he equaled the record of most dismissals in an innings by a wicket-keeper, with nine. By taking four catches in the second innings he also finished with a match record tally of dismissals with 13. In the same match as he set that record, he scored 99 runs while batting in the first innings and was left stranded on 99 not out in the second innings — the only player to have achieved this double near-miss.

References

1965 births
Living people
Cricketers from Bulawayo
Zimbabwean cricketers
Matabeleland cricketers
Zimbabwe One Day International cricketers
Zimbabwe Test cricketers
Cricketers at the 1992 Cricket World Cup
Zimbabwean cricket coaches
Coaches of the Zimbabwe national cricket team
White Zimbabwean sportspeople
Wicket-keepers